This was a split single released by Empty Records in 1992, originally as part of a series of singles pressed on clear, saw shaped vinyl.

The inside the foldout sleeve is a spread of a Mudhoney vs Gas Huffer "fight", photographed by Alice Wheeler.

Track listing

 Side 1 - You Stupid Asshole performed by Mudhoney, written by the Angry Samoans.
 Side 2 - Knife Manual performed Gas Huffer, written by the Silly Killers.

Releases 
Saw shaped clear vinyl - MT-166 - 1992

1992 singles